Godwin Nogheghase Obaseki (born 1 July 1957) is a Nigerian politician and businessman who is currently the Governor of Edo State. He was first elected governor under the platform of the All Progressive Congress (APC) in the year 2016 where He defeated Mr. Osagie Ize-Iyamu of the PDP and was sworned in as governor on 12 November 2016. Before becoming governor, he served as chairman of the Edo State Economic and Strategy Team inaugurated by former Governor Adams Oshiomole in March 2009.

Obaseki holds post graduate degrees in both Finance and International Business, and is a Fellow of the Chartered Institute of Stock Brokers, Nigeria.

Obaseki served as an executive board member of several private companies including Afrinvest. He is the recipient of the Nigerian Union of Teachers (NUT) award for best performing Governor of the year in October 2019.

Early life and education 
Obaseki was born in Benin City, Edo State, Nigeria, Obaseki is the third child of Late Pa Roland Obaseki and Gbinigie of Owina Street, Ogbelaka Quarters, Benin City. He attended St. Matthew's Primary School for his primary school education and proceeded to Eghosa Grammar School, in Benin City, for secondary education.

Higher education 
Obaseki, thereafter proceeded to the University of Ibadan where he obtained a Bachelor of Arts Degree in Classics. For his mandatory one year National Youth Service, he served in Jos, Plateau State. He later left Nigeria for the United States to attend Columbia University and Pace University in New York, where he obtained an MBA in Finance and International Business.

Obaseki is the founding secretary, (1992), of a US-based Africa Chamber of Commerce. He was also a Director of Junior Achievement of Nigeria – the local affiliate of international Non Profit Organisation (NGO).

Career

Investment banking career 
Obaseki began his career as a stockbroker in 1983 with Capital Trust Brokers Limited, Lagos. He later transferred his services to the International Merchant Bank. He moved to AVC Funds Limited, Lagos, in 1988, where he served as a Project Manager. He moved back to New York and worked as a Principal of Equatorial Finance Company, a Financial Advisory firm. He focused on Africa and provided Structured Trade Finance for African-related transactions.

Afrinvest 
In 1995, Godwin Obaseki founded Afrinvest West Africa Limited (formerly Securities Transactions & Trust Company Limited (SecTrust), which has grown to become one of the most reputable investment banking and management firms in Nigeria.

Obaseki later stepped down from his position as chairman of the board of directors of Afrinvest in September 2016, to contest the gubernatorial election in Edo State.

Politics and public policy 
In an article by Vanguard daily, he was tagged the "Wake and See Governor." Pundits say this is because he prefers working and delivering infrastructural projects without prior fanfare or needless rhetoric.

Before becoming the Edo State Governor, Obaseki served as the Chairman of the Economic and Strategy Team (EST). In that capacity, he pioneered a number of policy reforms that saw the state restructure its public finance, secure funding for infrastructure and improve the business environment to attract investment in power, agriculture and other critical sectors. Obaseki was also instrumental in attracting the Edo-Azura power project, with support from World Bank to the state.

Aside these, some of his other reforms include:

 injecting a culture of regular retreats as a platform for engagement and consensus building in planning, executing and evaluating state development initiatives and their outcomes
 N25 Billion Infrastructure Development Bond from the Nigerian Capital Market in 2010
 inspiring Sector-based Economic Summits and Policy Dialogue Series

For seven years in the administration of Governor Adams Oshiomhole, his predecessor, he served as voluntary Chairman of the Edo State Economic and Strategy Team as well as Chairman of Tax Assessment Review Committee for Edo State Internal Revenue Service (TARC) and the Committee on Micro, Small and Medium Enterprises (MSME), respectively.

He was Secretary of the Committee on the Implementation of the Law, Establishing the present Edo University, Iyamho, and member of the Committee on Contributory Pension Scheme and Edo SEEFOR/DPO Steering Committee, respectively.

Before serving at the sub-national level, Obaseki served in the Presidential Committee on the Reform of the Nigerian Pension System, which facilitated the introduction of the contributory pension scheme and other novel pension reforms.

He also served in the Nigerian Securities and Exchange Commission Committee on the Re-activation of the Nigerian Bond Market and the review of the Investment and Securities Act. Between 2006 and 2009, he served as a member of the Nigerian Stock Exchange Council. He is a Trustee of the Dr Jackson Owen Obaseki Foundation, a family-owned Non-Governmental Organization (NGO).

He publicly stated in October 2019 that he will be running for a second term in the State's Gubernatorial election coming up in 2020 stating that his re-election is non-negotiable.

He was controversially disqualified from contesting in the APC primary elections by the screening committee due to his disagreements with the National chairman of the party and his predecessor in office comrade Adams Oshiomhole.

Policies, projects and initiatives 
Since assuming duty as the Executive Governor of Edo State on 12 November 2016, Mr. Godwin Nogheghase Obaseki has enacted projects with the aim of making the state an investment hub. Such projects, includes:

 The Benin River Port Project (Gelegele Seaport)
 The Benin Industrial Park
 Modular Refinery Project
 Technology hubs
 Edojobs
 Edo State Oil Palm Programme (ESOPP) 
 Ossiomo Power Project 
 Edo Tech Park 

Asides his infrastructural projects, he has also enacted a number of social development initiatives. The state government has proposed to build about 200 Primary Healthcare Centres. Obaseki's focus in the health sector is to develop a viable primary healthcare system to provide affordable and accessible health care services to people in the state. He is also pioneering a state-backed Health insurance scheme to provide a robust sector that will attract private investors.

In education, Obaseki launched the Edo Basic Education Transformation (Edo BEST) programme, an initiative to train and equip public school teachers with top-of-the-range skills and expertise for deploying Information and Communication Technologies (ICTs) in classrooms to improve learning outcomes. There is also a strong emphasis on technical education, which led to the revamping of the Government Science and Technical College (formerly Benin Technical College) to train workforce in the state.

He has also vigorously pushed Edo state as a viable investment destination. In January 2018, his government established the Edo State Investment Promotion Office (ESIPO) to facilitate investments and stakeholders engagements so as to improve the business environment in the state.

He has also contributed to the fight against human trafficking and illegal migration.

He also embarked on a massive reconstruction of the Samuel Ogbemudia Stadium to host the 2020 National Sports Festival.

The governor attracted $500m worth of investment into the state through the Edo State Oil Palm Programme (ESOPP), a novel idea that is poised to attract oil palm plantations to the state, as over 100,000 hectares of arable land are under cultivation in the programme. Some of the companies investing in oil palm development are Dufil (makers of Indomie Noodles), Fayus, Nosak, Saro Group of Companies, among others.

Politics 
On 29 September 2016, Obaseki was elected as the Governor of Edo State under the platform of the All Progressives Congress. During the 2020 Edo Gubernatorial Election, Obaseki sought for re-election under the APC but was controversially disqualified by the party's Primary Election Screening Committee from contesting the primary elections, citing missing letters on the governor's National Youth Service Corps (NYSC) certificate and what other observers described as spurious excuses surrounding the governor's university admission. The governor had had a running battle with his predecessor, Comrade Oshiomhole, the National Chairman of the APC, who headed the party's National Working Committee (NWC) at the time, which constituted the screening committee. Political analysts argue that the former governor acted out a script, with the ultimate aim of denying the governor a second-term ticket under the APC. Comrade Oshiomhole was eventually sacked as National Chairman of the APC.

The governor was in possession of his West African Examination Council High School Certificate, which the committee said was absent from the governor's credentials, while the NYSC reissued a corrected version of the governor's NYSC discharge certificate, while apologizing for being responsible for the initial error. The Federal High Court in Abuja eventually struck out a certificate forgery case instituted against the governor by the All Progressives Congress (APC), his former political party. He said the ruling was victory for truth, and victory rule of law. He said the case against him was a most needless attempt by desperate individuals trying to undo the will of the people through the backdoor.

On 16 June 2020, Obaseki resigned his membership from the All Progressives Congress. On 19 June 2020, Obaseki decamped to the People's Democratic Party and declared his intentions to seek re-election on the platform. PDP described him as a big catch. On 20 September 2020, The Independent National Electoral Commission (INEC) announced Obaseki the winner of the Edo State gubernatorial election, He won against his major opponent from the All Progressives Congress Osagie Ize Iyamu with a total number of 307,955 votes.

Controversy 
An  alleged  certificate forgery suit was instituted by the All Progressives Congress (APC) against Gov. Obaseki.  According to the Premium times publication on 9 January 2021, the Federal High Court in Abuja  dismissed the certificate forgery suit instituted by the All Progressives Congress (APC) against Governor Godwin Obaseki of Edo State.

Personal life 
Obaseki is married to Betsy Bene Obaseki, a financial expert. She holds a Bachelor and Master's degree in Accounting from the University of Lagos, and an alumna of the Kellog's School of Business Executive Management Programme, USA. He is also an avid golfer.

See also
List of Governors of Edo State

References

External links
 Government website

Living people
People from Edo State
Nigerian Roman Catholics
Nigerian political candidates
Governors of Edo State
1957 births
University of Ibadan alumni
Pace University alumni
Columbia University alumni
Nigerian stockbrokers
Nigerian chairpersons of corporations